Jonathan Peveritt Brent (born 29 January 1956) is a Zimbabwean first-class cricketer who played for Manicaland cricket team and for the Zimbabwe cricket team in the 1990 ICC Trophy.

References

External links
 

1956 births
Living people
Zimbabwean cricketers
Sportspeople from Harare
Manicaland cricketers